Man Vs Weird is British reality television show produced by Twenty Twenty and broadcast on Channel 4 from 12 May to 2 June 2014.

The Show 
The program features actor Simon Farnaby traveling the world in search on people with incredible talents and unusual abilities such as Biba Struja who claims to be immune to electricity and Zamora The Torture King.

Episodes

References

External links 
 
 Website

2014 British television series debuts
2014 British television series endings
2010s British reality television series
Channel 4 original programming
Television series by Warner Bros. Television Studios
English-language television shows